New York's 112th State Assembly district is one of the 150 districts in the New York State Assembly. It has been represented by Mary Beth Walsh since 2017.

Geography

2020s
District 112 contains portions of Fulton, Saratoga and Schenectady counties.

2010s
District 112 contains portions of Saratoga and Schenectady counties.

Recent election results

2022

2020

2018

2016

2014

2012

References 

112
Saratoga County, New York
Schenectady County, New York